Pere Marquette 1225 is a class "N-1" 2-8-4 "Berkshire" type steam locomotive built in October 1941 for the Pere Marquette Railway (PM) by Lima Locomotive Works (LLW) in Lima, Ohio. No. 1225 is one of two surviving Pere Marquette 2-8-4 locomotives, the other being 1223, which is on display at the Tri-Cities Historical Society near the ex-Grand Trunk Western (GTW) coaling tower in Grand Haven, Michigan. It is perhaps most famous for serving as the basis for the locomotive in the 2004 film, The Polar Express.

The Pere Marquette Railway used No. 1225 in regular service from the locomotive's construction in 1941 until the railroad merged into Chesapeake and Ohio Railway (C&O) in 1947; It remained in use on C&O's Michigan lines until 1951. Escaping from the scrapyard, No. 1225 was acquired by the Michigan State University in 1957 and put on static display.

In 1969, a group of students took an interest in No. 1225, and in 1971, the Michigan State University Railroad Club was formed and began work to restore No. 1225 to operational status, an effort that culminated with its first excursion run in 1988. The locomotive, listed on the National Register of Historic Places, is now used for the "North Pole Express," an excursion train that runs from Owosso, Michigan, to Ashley, Michigan over the former Tuscola and Saginaw Bay Railway, now Great Lakes Central Railroad operated by the Steam Railroading Institute. As of 2023, No. 1225 is out of service for mechanical repair work to its running gear.



History

Revenue service (1941–1951)

No. 1225 is a 2-8-4 steam locomotive built in October 1941 by Lima Locomotive Works in Lima, Ohio (LLW) at a cost of $200,000 for the Pere Marquette Railway (PM). PM ordered this wheel arrangement type in three different locomotive classes from Lima: class N in 1937 (Nos. 1201–1215), class N-1 in 1941 (Nos. 1216–1227), and class N-2 in 1944 (Nos. 1228–1239).

The 1200s remained on the roster through the PM's merger into Chesapeake and Ohio Railway (C&O) in 1947; class N were renumbered to 2685–2699, class N-1 to 2650–2661, and class N-2 to 2670–2681. Part of the merger agreement, however, included the stipulation that locomotives that were acquired and fully paid for by PM would remain painted for PM after the merger. Although all the Berkshires received new numbers, only class N engines were repainted into the standard C&O livery and renumbered. The majority of the class N locomotives were scrapped between 1954 and 1957, but class N-1s 1223 and 1225 were both preserved.

For the first part of its service life, 1225 was used to shuttle steel and wartime freight between Detroit, Saginaw, Flint and northern Indiana steel mills. After ten years of service, the engine was retired and sat in a scrap yard until 1957.

Retirement and Gift to MSU (1951–1957)
In 1955, Michigan State University Trustee, Forest Akers, the former VP of Dodge Motors, was asked by C&O Chairman Cyrus Eaton if the university would be interested in having a steam locomotive (Eaton did not want to scrap the engines but was having a hard time finding places that would accept them) so that engineering students would have a piece of real equipment to study. Akers proposed the idea to University President John Hannah, who accepted the gift of the locomotive. When he told the Dean of the College of Engineering about the gift, the Dean said that Engineering was not interested in an obsolete locomotive. John Hannah then called up Dr. Rollin Baker, director of the MSU Museum and told him that he was getting a locomotive. The C&O then instructed the yardmaster at New Buffalo to send an engine to the Wyoming Shops for a cosmetic restoration and repainting with the name Chesapeake and Ohio on the side. Lighted number boards were added as was the standard for C&O engines, though the Pere Marquette Railway never used them. Eventually, the Michigan State Trust for Railway Preservation, operating at the Steam Railway Institute, decided to remove these. No. 1225 was the last engine in the line, i.e. easiest to get out.

Baker received the gift of the locomotive in June 1957 when it was brought to campus. The locomotive remained on static display near Spartan Stadium on the Michigan State campus in East Lansing, Michigan for more than a decade. While on display, a child by the name of Chris Van Allsburg used to stop by the locomotive on football weekends, on his way to the game with his father.  He later stated that the engine was the inspiration for the story, Polar Express.

Michigan State Railroad Club (1966–1976)
During the time that Akers was alive, til 1966, money was allocated to paint and display the engine. In 1969, a group of MSU students formed the Michigan State University Railroad Club as a railfan group. Steve Reeves, a student and part-time employee of the Museum, whose responsibility was to display the engine on football weekends, sent out a notice in the State News that the Railroad Club would be meeting. Those early meetings did not discuss the restoration of the engine. Instead, they were slide shows of engines various members had seen on trips across the US, most of which were diesels. In 1970, at the suggestion of Randy Paquette, the club investigated the possibility of restoring the locomotive to running condition and started on that goal in 1971, with Baker's permission. Baker later stated that he thought having students be occupied with restoring a locomotive was far more in keeping with his idea of the image the university should be presenting than campus protests. Dr. Breslin, the university vice president, was not so sure. After the club started removing the sheet metal and exposing a rusty boiler, Breslin sent Baker to the engine with two messages. The first was the instruction to paint the engine. (The engine needs to look good, even when it is being worked on). The second message was the day the students stop working on the engine is the day the torches come out. The locomotive was safe as long as the students kept working on it. To emphasize, he had the hopper car next to the engine cut up the next week.

The students fired up the boiler in 1975 and blew the 1225's whistle for the first time in two decades. The MSU Railroad Club had looked to engine 1223 at the State Fairgrounds for parts. The Michigan Railroad Club, then custodians of that engine, objected, so needed parts were fabricated. As of 2016, 1223 is preserved in a lakeside park in Grand Haven, Michigan.

In 1976, Chuck Julian talked to Dr. Baker about the locomotive.  He asked Baker if he understood what members were asking in 1970, when they said that they wanted to restore the locomotive. Baker said that he fully understood. He thought that he would rather students be known for being involved in restoring a locomotive than known for protesting the war.

The Search for a New Home (1977–1985)
In 1977, Dr. Edgar Harden became the University Interim President. Chuck Julian, as president of the MSU Railroad Club, went to his reception and made an appointment to see him. Harden was asked about the engine's future. The Railroad Club had fired the engine and it was nearing operability. Harden said that the university was not interested in running a locomotive and if it was, it would be run by all university employees. He said that if the Railroad Club wanted to run the engine, it should form a 501(c)(3) corporation and then he would give the club the engine.

In that meeting, Dr. Harden told Chuck Julian that the university was closing the Shaw Lane Power Plant and planned to pull up the tracks.  The railroad had informed the university that it did not want to maintain a switch on a line not being used. With no switch, there was no need to keep the track. If the Club wanted to be able to get the engine off the display track and onto the mainline, it needed to move it soon. Dr. Harden gave the MSURRC permission to connect the display track to the siding and move the engine over to a part of the track near the police station, with the provision that the club provide a bond, remove the fence, stairs and all of its belongings from the display site, then tear up the track put down along with the display track.  The club also had to repair the sidewalk that it needed to go through after it was done and generally clean up the site.

Colin Williams, of Williams Brothers Asphalt Paving Co. of Ionia, Michigan provided the club with a surety bond, a dump truck, a front-end loader and a bulldozer plus operators to run the equipment which was used to build the grade. Club members then tore up the track next to the engine and laid it down behind the engine. The engine was then rolled down the tracks.  Chuck Julian, Dave Jones, an equipment operator from Williams Brothers, Dick Grieves, and a group of Hmong refugees who volunteered their time, then spent the next three days with the Williams Brothers equipment restoring the site, including casting a new concrete sidewalk.  Williams Brothers sent a grader from Ionia to fine grade the site after they were done with the bulk cleanup, including loading debris into the dump truck and rails onto a flatbed and hauling all of it to Ionia.

Dr. Harden said that if the club could find another place on campus that was suitable, it could move the engine to it. He assigned Ted Simmons and the head of the Landscape Arts Department the task of working with Chuck Julian to find a place. They visited several places. Ted Simmons was not willing to give up a siding at Power Plant 65 for the engine. The club would need to build one if it wanted one. The club would not be able to build a cheap structure. If the club or later the trust wanted a structure, it would need to be built by contractors after the university approved the design.

This set club members to looking for a new site.  Several were looked at. The Ann Arbor Railroad had gone bankrupt at the time and the State of Michigan became the owner of its assets. Hank Londo spoke to his state Senator and arranged for the new Michigan State Trust for Railway Preservation (MSTRP) to lease the Owosso engine shop. The engine and all of its equipment were then moved there. This was a great place to move because the engine shop had a lot of equipment that would be useful in restoring the engine.

The MSU Railroad Club and supporters of "Project 1225" formed the Michigan State Trust for Railway Preservation in 1978. Chuck Julian, then president of the MSU Railroad Club, became the Trust's first president. Soon after, the MSTRP was given ownership of 1225 by Michigan State University. The MSTRP moved 1225 to the former Ann Arbor Railroad steam backshop in Owosso in 1983.

Excursion service (1985–present)

On November 30, 1985, the engine was restored and moved again under its own power for the first time since its retirement in 1951. The first excursion service occurred in 1988 on a 17-mile trip between Owosso and St. Charles, Michigan. In August 1991, 1225 along with NKP 765 pulled a 31-car passenger train during the National Railway Historical Society's annual convention in Huntington, West Virginia.

The Trust started using the name, Steam Railroading Institute because it was thought that this name better represented the goals of the organization. The official name is still Michigan State Trust for Railway Preservation. The SRI name is registered as a DBA (Doing Business As), with the State of Michigan.

PM 1225 attended the Train Festival 2009 in Owosso, Michigan from July 23–26 as part of a fundraiser to raise money for 1225's upcoming 2010-2013 FRA overhaul. The national event showcased hundreds of train related items, events, and themes from around the country and some parts of the world. No. 1225 was not able to haul any excursions during the Festival due to 5 of its flues failing, which occurred on July 24. 1225 was on display during the rest of festival for people to visit the engine, chat with the crew, take photos, and explore the cab. On October 7, 2008, it was announced that NKP 765 would once again join 1225 at Train Festival, marking the first time the two Berk's have met each other since 1991. The famous Southern Pacific 4449 Daylight locomotive also attended the festival as one of the many attending engines along with the 1225 and 765. 1225 and 765 met up twice more that year, with a photo freight in August and an excursion in October.

The flue failing was later repeated on December 5 of that year, so in January 2010, 1225 went down for its required 15-year inspection, and it was found that the firebox sheets had deteriorated to the point of needing replacement. That program was largely completed through small and large donations of funds and labor by the organization's supporters. Approximately $900,000 had spent on 1225's FRA overhaul.

On October 20, 2013, the engine was fired up for a test run and moved again for the first time since 2009. It will run again for another 15 years until 2028 when its next overhaul work is due.

As of 2014, No. 1225 operates excursion trains over the Great Lakes Central Railroad (formally Tuscola and Saginaw Bay Railway) several times per year, including operations that leave Owosso and going to locations such as Alma, Clare, Mt. Pleasant, and Cadillac, Michigan. Since 2004, 1225 has hauled winter weekend excursions to Ashley, Michigan between Thanksgiving and the middle of December, due to copyright issues, as the "North Pole Express."

In 2021, the No. 1225 locomotive had its pony truck, trailing wheels, and tender trucks upgraded with roller bearings. In 2022, the locomotive is going under a significant overhaul to its wheels and running gear with assistance from FMW Solutions. Due to this, No. 1225 was unable to operate any trips for 2022.

Influence on The Polar Express
In 2002, Warner Bros. was given copies of the 1225's blueprints, saved from oblivion and donated to the MSURRC by Hank Truer, which were the prototype for the locomotive image, and its sounds were used in the 2004 film The Polar Express, directed by Robert Zemeckis. However, the whistle used in the film was provided by steam locomotive Sierra No. 3 of Back to the Future Part III fame, which was also directed by Zemeckis. The film was based on the Caldecott Medal winning book of the same name. The children's book was written and illustrated by Chris Van Allsburg, who grew up in Grand Rapids, Michigan, and as a child attended every home football game at Michigan State, next to which this engine was on static display. He recalls playing on this engine many times as a child saying, "I remember that train on campus,...I can't believe it's the same train! I climbed on that train. I actually stood on it." Appropriately enough, the locomotive's road number is the date of Christmas, 12/25.

Some people claim that the 1225 was picked out by the railroad to give to MSU because the number represented Christmas Day.  Chuck Julian, in speaking to Sam Chidester and Herschal Christiansen, had it revealed to him that the engine was chosen because it was the last engine on the line at New Hudson, waiting to be scrapped.  It was the easiest one to get out.  The number was not a consideration at all.  Phil Gary, the brakeman who accompanied the engine to campus, confirmed the story.

The 1225 and the other locomotives on the scrap line, sat there for many years after the railroad had stopped running steam.  This was because the railroad could not scrap the engines until the liens to Detroit Bank and Trust (later to become known as Comerica), were paid off and removed.

See also 

 Pere Marquette 1223
 Nickel Plate Road 765
 Chesapeake and Ohio 2716
 Chicago and North Western 175 - 1225's current stablemate
 Grand Trunk Western 6325

References

Bibliography

Further reading

External links 

 Steam Railroading Institute - official website of Pere Marquette 1225.

1225
2-8-4 locomotives
Lima locomotives
Individual locomotives of the United States
National Register of Historic Places in Michigan
National Register of Historic Places in Shiawassee County, Michigan
Transportation in Shiawassee County, Michigan
Railway locomotives on the National Register of Historic Places
Railway locomotives introduced in 1941
Freight locomotives
Standard gauge locomotives of the United States
Rail transportation on the National Register of Historic Places in Michigan
1′D2′ h2 locomotives
Preserved steam locomotives of Michigan